Stuart Dybek (born April 10, 1942) is an American writer of fiction and poetry.

Biography 
Dybek, a second-generation Polish American, was born in Chicago, Illinois and raised in Chicago's Little Village and Pilsen neighborhoods in the 1950s and early 1960s. He graduated from St. Rita of Cascia High School in 1959 and earned an MFA from the Iowa Writers' Workshop at the University of Iowa. He has an MA in literature from Loyola University Chicago.

Often compared to Saul Bellow and Theodore Dreiser for his unique portrayal of setting and landscapes, Dybek is "among the first writers of Polish descent (who write about the ethnic self) to receive national recognition."

After teaching for more than 30 years at Western Michigan University, where he remains an Adjunct Professor of English and a member of the permanent faculty of the Prague Summer Program, Dybek became the Distinguished Writer in Residence at Northwestern University where he teaches at the School of Professional Studies.

Work
Dybek's two collections of poems are Brass Knuckles (1979) and Streets in Their Own Ink (2004). His fiction includes Childhood and Other Neighborhoods, The Coast of Chicago, I Sailed With Magellan, a novel-in-stories, Paper Lantern: Love Stories, and Ecstatic Cahoots: Fifty Short Stories. His work has been anthologized and has appeared in magazines such as Harper's, The New Yorker, Atlantic Monthly, Poetry, Tin House, Ploughshares, and Triquarterly.

His collection, The Coast of Chicago, was selected as a New York Times Notable Book and cited as an American Library Association Notable Book of 2005. A story from I Sailed With Magellan,  titled "Breasts," appears in the 2004 Best American Short Stories.

Dybek was a participant in the Michigan Writers Series at Michigan State University, where he read from his work.

Awards
Dybek's awards include a Lannan Prize, a PEN/Malamud Award (1995), a Whiting Award (1985), a Guggenheim fellowship, and an O. Henry Award. Dybek was awarded a MacArthur Fellowship on September 25, 2007.

Bibliography

Novels and short story collections

Poetry collections

Pelligro

Short stories and essays
 "Prayer" | X-1 Experimental Fiction Project | The Smith: 1976 | 49-52

References

External links
New York Times review of Coast of Chicago
Stuart Dybek interview at The Writing Disorder
Stuart Dybek bio at Northwestern University
Profile at The Whiting Foundation

American male poets
1942 births
Living people
Loyola University Chicago alumni
University of Iowa alumni
Western Michigan University faculty
Northern Michigan University faculty
Northwestern University faculty
Writers from Michigan
Iowa Writers' Workshop alumni
Iowa Writers' Workshop faculty
Polish-American culture in Chicago
MacArthur Fellows
American people of Polish descent
O. Henry Award winners
PEN/Malamud Award winners